Phoolwanti is an Indian musical drama TV series broadcast on Doordarshan in 1992, starring Arun Govil, Archana Joglekar and Savita Prabhune. The show was produced by Usha Mangeshkar, with music by Hridaynath Mangeshkar and playback singing by Lata Mangeshkar. The show was based on a story by writer Babasaheb Purandare, with screenplay, dialogues and lyrics by Vasant Deo.

Premise 
In 18th century Pune, a beautiful dancer Phoolwanti (Archana Joglekar), takes umbrage to a comment on her by classical music exponent (Shastri ji, played by Arun Govil). They have a competitive bet, and they that whoever loses, that person will become disciple of the winner. Phoolwanti loses in the competition, becomes a student of Shastriji, and comes to live in his house, much to the concern of his wife (played by Savita Prabhune).

Cast 
 Arun Govil as Pandit Venkatesh Shastri
 Archana Joglekar as Phoolwanti
 Savita Prabhune as Shastri's wife

References 

DD National original programming
Television series set in the 18th century
Indian musical television series
Television shows set in Pune
1992 Indian television series debuts